Yekoua is a village and rural commune in Niger.

References

Zinder Region
Communes of Niger